Marco Grüll (born 6 July 1998) is an Austrian professional footballer who plays as a forward for Austrian Bundesliga club Rapid Wien and the Austria national team.

Club career
Grüll started his senior team career with SC Pfarrwerfen in Austrian fifth division at the age of fifteen. He joined Ried in January 2019.

On 10 February 2021, Rapid Wien announced that Grüll will join the club on a free transfer prior to 2021–22 season.

International career
Grüll is a former Austrian youth international. In March 2021, he was named in the reserve list of the senior team for 2022 FIFA World Cup qualification matches against Scotland, Faroe Islands and Denmark. In October 2021, he received his first call-up to the Austrian senior team after several players from original squad withdrew due to injury. He made his debut on 12 October 2021 in a World Cup qualifier against Denmark.

Career statistics

Club

International

Honours

Individual
 Austrian Bundesliga Team of the Year: 2021–22

References

External links
 

1998 births
Living people
Association football forwards
Austrian footballers
Austria youth international footballers
Austria under-21 international footballers
Austria international footballers
Austrian Football Bundesliga players
2. Liga (Austria) players
Austrian Regionalliga players
SV Ried players
SK Rapid Wien players